Oruvan may refer to:
 Oruvan (1999 film), an Indian Tamil-language action drama film
 Oruvan (2006 film), an Indian Malayalam-language film